Hon. Edward George Moore M.A. (1798 - 8 February 1876) was a Canon of Windsor from 1834 to 1876

Family

He was the third son of Stephen Moore, 2nd Earl Mount Cashell and Margaret King, an Irish hostess, writer, traveller, and medical adviser.

In 1827 he married Ann Matilda, daughter of 16th Lord Clinton

Career

He was educated at St John's College, Cambridge and graduated MA in 1822.

He was appointed:
Rector of West Ilsley, Berkshire.

He was appointed to the eleventh stall in St George's Chapel, Windsor Castle in 1834, and held the stall until 1876.

Notes 

1798 births
1876 deaths
Canons of Windsor
Alumni of St John's College, Cambridge
Younger sons of earls